Furna may refer to:

Furna, a municipality in Switzerland
Furna (Brava), a settlement on the island of Brava in Cape Verde
Furna (Fogo), a settlement on the island of Fogo in Cape Verde
Achada Furna, a settlement on the island of Fogo in Cape Verde
Vilarinho da Furna, a former village in Portugal
Furna de Água, a cave in the Azores

See also 

 Furni (disambiguation)
 Furno